Edward Montagu (25 September 1649 – 27 February 1690) was an English politician, the son of Hon. George Montagu. He was the MP for Northamptonshire (12 May 1685 – 1690) and Seaford (7 Mar 1681 — 6 Apr 1685).

References

1649 births
1690 deaths
Edward
English MPs 1681
English MPs 1685–1687
English MPs 1689–1690